The 1976 Lady Wigram Trophy was contested as part of the Peter Stuyvesant Series on 18 January 1976. The winner was New Zealander Ken Smith.

Results

Qualifying

Ken Smith (F5000), 1'07.5
Max Stewart (F5000), 1'07.8
Kevin Bartlett (F5000), 1'09.8
Graeme Lawrence (F5000), 1'10.3
Jim Murdoch (F5000), 1'10.4
Brian Redman (F2), 1'10.6
Bruce Allison (F5000), 1'11.2
Paul Bernasconi (F5000), 1'11.2
John Edmonds (F5000), 1'15.5
Baron Robertson (F5000), 1'15.8
Graham Baker (F5000), 1'17.6
Gary Love (F5000), 1'22.3
Neil Doyle (F5000), No Time
Robbie Booth (F5000), No Time

References

External links
 OldRacingCars.com
 New Zealand Motorsport Archive
 Canterbury Car Club (Organiser)

Lady Wigram Trophy
1976 in New Zealand motorsport
January 1976 sports events in New Zealand